Peebles and Southern Midlothian was a county constituency of the House of Commons of the Parliament of the United Kingdom (Westminster) from 1918 to 1950. It elected one Member of Parliament (MP) by the first past the post voting system.

Boundaries

The Peebles and Southern Midlothian constituency was described in the Representation of the People Act 1918 as comprising:
The county of Peebles with all the burghs situated therein, and the Gala Water and Lasswade County Districts of Midlothian (except that part of the latter district which is included in the Northern Division) with all burghs situated therein except the burghs of Leith and Musselburgh.

Until 1918 the area of the constituency was, at least nominally, partly within the Peebles and Selkirk constituency and partly within the Midlothian constituency.

When the constituency was abolished in 1950 the Midlothian and Peeblesshire constituency was created.

Members of Parliament

Election results

Elections in the 1910s

Elections in the 1920s

Elections in the 1930s

General Election 1939–40:
Another General Election was required to take place before the end of 1940. The political parties had been making preparations for an election to take place and by the Autumn of 1939, the following candidates had been selected; 
Unionist: 
Labour: David Pryde

Elections in the 1940s

References 

Historic parliamentary constituencies in Scotland (Westminster)
Politics of the Scottish Borders
Politics of Midlothian
Constituencies of the Parliament of the United Kingdom established in 1918
Constituencies of the Parliament of the United Kingdom disestablished in 1950